Dixie County is a county located in the Big Bend region of the northern part of the U.S. state of Florida. As of the 2020 census, the population was 16,759. Its county seat is Cross City.

History
Dixie County was created in 1921 from the southern portion of Lafayette County and named for "Dixie", the common nickname for the southern United States.

Geography

Adjacent counties
 Taylor County - northwest
 Lafayette County - north
 Gilchrist County - east
 Levy County - southeast

National protected area
 Lower Suwannee National Wildlife Refuge (part)

Demographics

As of the 2020 United States census, there were 16,759 people, 6,233 households, and 4,320 families residing in the county.

As of the census of 2008, there were 14,957 people. In 2000 there were an estimated 5,205 households and 3,659 families residing in the county. The population density was 20 people per square mile (8/km2).  There were 7,362 housing units at an average density of 10 per square mile (4/km2). The racial makeup of the county was 88.80% White, 8.98% Black or African American, 0.46% Native American, 0.25% Asian, 0.03% Pacific Islander, 0.45% from other races, and 1.03% from two or more races. 1.80% of the population were Hispanic or Latino of any race.  In terms of ancestry, 39.7% were English, 15.2% were Irish, 14.7% were American, and 5.2% were German.

There were 5,205 households, out of which 27.40% had children under the age of 18 living with them, 54.90% were married couples living together, 10.60% had a female householder with no husband present, and 29.70% were non-families. 23.90% of all households were made up of individuals, and 11.60% had someone living alone who was 65 years of age or older. The average household size was 2.44 and the average family size was 2.87.

In the county, the population was spread out, with 22.10% under the age of 18, 7.90% from 18 to 24, 26.60% from 25 to 44, 26.20% from 45 to 64, and 17.10% who were 65 years of age or older. The median age was 41 years. For every 100 females there were 113.90 males. For every 100 females age 18 and over, there were 117.20 males.

The median income for a household in the county was $26,082, and the median income for a family was $31,157. Males had a median income of $26,694 versus $17,863 for females. The per capita income for the county was $13,559. About 14.50% of families and 19.10% of the population were below the poverty line, including 23.90% of those under age 18 and 16.10% of those age 65 or over.

Politics

Voter registration
According to the Secretary of State's office, Republicans constitute the majority of registered voters in Dixie County.

Statewide elections
Republicans hold the majority of registered voters in the county. Democrats have not carried a majority of votes in a Presidential election since 1980 (and last carried a plurality in 1996), nor have they carried a majority in a gubernatorial election since 1994. The county has rapidly and steadily shifted Republican since the 1990s; by 2016, the Republican candidate earned over 80% of the vote in the Presidential election. In 2020, the Republican nominee gained over 82% of the vote.

Points of interest
 City of Hawkinsville - sunken steamboat in the Suwannee River near Old Town, one of the Florida Underwater Archaeological Preserves.
 Old Town Elementary School, now the Dixie County Cultural Center.
 Old Town Methodist Church built in 1890 located behind the 1983 church building.
 Putnam Lodge in Cross City, Florida built by the Putnam Lumber Company for its nearby lumber town of Shamrock

Library
The Dixie County Library is part of the Three Rivers Regional Library System, which also serves Gilchrist, Lafayette, and Taylor counties. It is located at 16328 SE 19th Highway in Cross City, Florida. The branch is open Monday through Friday, 8:30 a.m.–5:30 p.m. The current library director is Cindy Bellot.

Communities

Towns
 Cross City
 Horseshoe Beach
 Old Town

Unincorporated communities

 Clara (partly in Taylor County)
 Eugene
 Hines
 Jena
 Jonesboro
 Old Town
 Shamrock
 Shired Island
 Suwannee
 Yellow Jacket

Transportation

Airports
 Dixie County Airport

See also
 National Register of Historic Places listings in Dixie County, Florida

Notes

References

External links

 HardisonInk.com, Online daily news website for Dixie, Gilchrist and Levy counties.
 Dixie County Advocate, local newspaper available in full-text for free from the Florida Digital Newspaper Library
 Dixie County Times, A recently started local newspaper managed by the former editor of the Dixie County Advocate.
 WZCC-AM 1240, Cross City's Community Radio Station.

Government links/Constitutional offices
 Dixie County Board of County Commissioners
 Dixie County Supervisor of Elections
 Dixie County Property Appraiser
 Dixie County Sheriff's Office
 Dixie County Tax Collector

Special districts
 Dixie County Schools 
 Suwannee River Water Management District

Judicial branch
  Dixie County Clerk of Courts
  Public Defender, 3rd Judicial Circuit of Florida serving Columbia, Dixie, Hamilton, Lafayette, Madison, Suwannee, and Taylor Counties
  Office of the State Attorney, 3rd Judicial Circuit of Florida
  Circuit and County Court for the 3rd Judicial Circuit of Florida

Tourism links
 Dixie County Tourist Development Council
 Dixie County Chamber of Commerce

 
1921 establishments in Florida
Populated places established in 1921
Florida counties
North Florida